Stadio Bruno Recchioni is a multi-use stadium in Fermo, Italy.  It is used mostly for football matches and is the home ground of Fermana Calcio.  The stadium holds 9,500.

Bruno Recchioni